Montaut is a commune in the Haute-Garonne department of southwestern France.

Geography
The Lèze flows north through the eastern part of the commune and forms part of its northeastern border.

The Garonne forms part of the commune's western border.

The commune is bordered by eight other communes: Mauzac to the north, Beaumont-sur-Lèze to the northwest, Auribail to the east, Saint-Sulpice-sur-Lèze to the southeast, Montgazin to the south, Marquefave to the southwest, Capens to the west, and finally by Noé to the northwest.

Population

See also
Communes of the Haute-Garonne department

References

Communes of Haute-Garonne